Banksia epimicta is a species of prostrate shrub that is endemic to a small area in the south-west of Western Australia. It has crowded, sharply pointed pinnatifid leaves, large heads of unpleasantly scented, creamy white and pale yellow flowers and a small number of follicles.

Description
Banksia epimicta is a prostrate, spreading shrub with its stems more or less on the ground and that forms a lignotuber. The flowers are borne on a down-turned head containing between forty-five and seventy pungent-smelling flowers in each head.

Taxonomy and naming
This banksia was first formally described in 1996 by Alex George in the journal Nuytsia and given the name Dryandra epimicta from specimens collected in 1986 near Kulin. In 2007, Austin Mast and Kevin Thiele transferred all the dryandras to the genus Banksia and this species became Banksia epimicta. The specific epithet (epimicta) is derived from the ancient Greek word mykter, meaning "a nose" or "a nostril" with the prefix epi- meaning "upon", referring to the strong, unpleasant smell of the flowers.

Distribution and habitat
Banksia epimicta grows in kwongan and shrubland in a small area near Kulin where only about one hundred plants were known in 1990.

Conservation status
This banksia is classified as "Priority Two" by the Western Australian Government Department of Parks and Wildlife meaning that it is poorly known and from only one or a few locations.

References

epimicta
Plants described in 1996
Endemic flora of Western Australia
Taxa named by Kevin Thiele